Ireland was represented by Linda Martin, with the Johnny Logan-penned song "Terminal 3", at the 1984 Eurovision Song Contest, which took place on 5 May in Luxembourg City. "Terminal 3" was chosen as the Irish entry at the national final on 31 March.

"Terminal 3" marked Ireland's return to Eurovision following RTÉ's decision to opt out of the 1983 contest because of financial constraints.

Before Eurovision

National final 
The final was held at the studios of broadcaster RTÉ in Dublin, hosted by Gay Byrne. Eight songs took part, with the winner chosen by voting from eight regional juries. Contestants included 1981 Irish representatives Sheeba, and Charlie McGettigan, who would go on to win Eurovision ten years down the line.

At Eurovision 
On the night of the final Martin performed 9th in the running order, following Belgium and preceding Denmark. Pre-contest, "Terminal 3" had been rated as one of the front runners in a field with no obvious stand-out song, and Martin gave a vocally strong and visually striking performance. The early voting was very close, with the lead changing hands regularly between Ireland, Denmark and Spain. However, from the half-way point, to the surprise of most observers, the unrated song from Sweden pulled away from the rest to claim victory with 145 points, with Ireland eventually finishing in second place with 137 points. "Terminal 3" received four maximum 12s – from Belgium, Italy, Sweden and Switzerland – with only Yugoslavia failing to award it any points at all. The Irish jury awarded its 12 points to Sweden.

Voting

References 

1984
Countries in the Eurovision Song Contest 1984
Eurovision
Eurovision